Fulmination may refer to;
 Detonation, a characteristic property of ionic chemical compounds which include the fulminate ion CNO−
A solemn political pronouncement, especially a papal bull
 Fulminant medical conditions